Ian Forrest Brydon (22 March 1927 – 22 July 1973) was a Scottish professional footballer who played as a centre forward in the Football League and the Scottish Football League.

References

1927 births
1973 deaths
Footballers from Edinburgh
Scottish footballers
Leith Athletic F.C. players
Accrington Stanley F.C. (1891) players
Darlington F.C. players
Bradford (Park Avenue) A.F.C. players
St Johnstone F.C. players
English Football League players
Scottish Football League players
Association football forwards
Kendal Town F.C. players
Tranent Juniors F.C. players